Vern Wilson (27 March 1931 – 27 January 1993) was  a former Australian rules footballer who played with Footscray in the Victorian Football League (VFL).

Notes

External links 		
		
		
		
		
1931 births		
1993 deaths		
Australian rules footballers from Victoria (Australia)
Western Bulldogs players